The 1962 Colorado gubernatorial election was held on November 6, 1962. Republican nominee John Arthur Love defeated Democratic incumbent Stephen McNichols with 56.67% of the vote. , this was the last time Pueblo County voted for the Republican candidate.

Primary elections
Primary elections were held on September 11, 1962.

Democratic primary

Candidates
Stephen McNichols, incumbent Governor

Results

Republican primary

Candidates
John Arthur Love, former President of the Colorado Springs Chamber of Commerce
David A. Hamil, former Speaker of the Colorado House of Representatives

Results

General election

Candidates
Major party candidates
John Arthur Love, Republican 
Stephen McNichols, Democratic

Other candidates
Louis K. Stephens, Socialist Labor
Stephen L. DeArvil, Independent

Results

References

1962
Colorado
Gubernatorial